G class or Class G may refer to:

Locomotives 
 NZR G class (1928), a type of steam locomotive used in New Zealand
 Tasmanian Government Railways G class, a class of  0-4-2T steam locomotive used in Australia
 V/Line G class, a class of diesel-electric locomotives
 SECR G class, a class of 4-4-0 steam locomotives
 Two types of diesel locomotives used by Córas Iompair Éireann:
 CIE 601 Class
 CIE 611 Class
 Australian Standard Garratt
 Metropolitan Railway G Class, a class of 0-6-4T steam locomotives
 Victorian Railways G class, a class of narrow gauge locomotives

 WAGR G class, a class of 2-6-0 steam locomotives operated by the Western Australian Government Railways

Ships 
 G-class destroyer (disambiguation), several classes of ships
 G-class frigate, one of the frigate classes of the Turkish Navy
 G-class landing craft, a vessel in use by the Finnish Navy and the Swedish Navy
 G-class submarine (disambiguation), several classes of ships
 OOCL G-class container ship, a class of very large container ships.

Other uses
Class G is a class of airspace in various airspace classification systems
G-class blimp, a type of blimp built in America from 1935
 Class G, a spectral class for stars
 Class G amplifier, a class of electronic amplifiers usually used in high-power audio applications
 Mercedes-Benz G-Class, a luxury SUV (sport utility vehicle)
 Short G-class, a transport flying-boat
Google Classroom